Zakhit is a rural locality (a selo) in Zakhitsky Selsoviet, Khivsky District, Republic of Dagestan, Russia. The population was 1,133 as of 2010. There are 12 streets.

Geography 
Zakhit is located 44 km east of Khiv (the district's administrative centre) by road. Novy Aul is the nearest rural locality.

References 

Rural localities in Khivsky District